Jimmy Lee Constable (June 14, 1933 – September 4, 2002) was a relief pitcher in Major League Baseball. From 1957 through 1963, he played for the New York/San Francisco Giants, Cleveland Indians, Washington Senators and Milwaukee Braves. Constable, nicknamed "Sheriff", was a switch-hitter and threw left-handed.

In a five -season career, Constable posted a 3–4 record with a 4.87 ERA and two saves in 56 games pitched.

Constable died in Johnson City, Tennessee, at the age of 69.

External links

Cienfuegos (Cuban League 1958–1959)
Historic Baseball
Retrosheet
Venezuelan Professional Baseball League

1933 births
2002 deaths
Baseball players from Tennessee
Cienfuegos players
Cleveland Indians players
Knoxville Smokies players
Leones del Caracas players
American expatriate baseball players in Venezuela
Leones del Escogido players
American expatriate baseball players in the Dominican Republic
Major League Baseball pitchers
Milwaukee Braves players
Minneapolis Millers (baseball) players
Nashville Vols players
New York Giants (NL) players
Oshkosh Giants players
People from Jonesborough, Tennessee
San Francisco Giants players
Tacoma Giants players
Toronto Maple Leafs (International League) players
Washington Senators (1901–1960) players
20th-century African-American sportspeople
21st-century African-American people